"Krafty" is a song by English music group New Order, released as the first single from their eighth studio album, Waiting for the Sirens' Call (2005). It marked the first new release by New Order for Warner Bros. Records without London Records and was produced by John Leckie, who is notable for his involvement in records such as Pink Floyd's The Dark Side of the Moon,  Simple Minds' Real to Real Cacophony, Radiohead's The Bends and The Stone Roses' debut album. As with most New Order releases, the artwork is provided by Peter Saville.

"Krafty" was released on 7 March 2005 in Australia and the United Kingdom with several remixes of the song on the B-side, and the song was released to US radio on 14 March 2005. The track reached number 26 in Ireland, number eight in the UK, and number four in Spain. In July 2005, it reached number two on the US Billboard Hot Dance Music/Club Play chart.

Critical reception
Reviews for the song were mixed; Pitchfork Media rated it 3/5, stating "This is a tough call to make, because New Order are often at their best when they're impossibly aloof, but there's a fine line between effortless and tuneless, and "Krafty" isn't the former." When reviewed on the BBC Radio show "Roundtable", one reviewer rated it 5/10, another 6/10 and yet another 7/10.

Music video
The music video, directed by Johan Renck, who also directed the video for "Crystal", appears to be set in Sweden and depicts two teenage lovers. The video has been noted for its close resemblance to the video Renck made for Kent's song "Kärleken Väntar".

Track listings

Charts

Release history

In popular culture
Upon the release of the Xbox 360, this song, along with a few other samples, were written on the hard drives of premium package 360s for use with the integrated music player. It was also included as part of the soundtrack of the game Project Gotham Racing 3.

References

2005 singles
2004 songs
London Records singles
Music videos directed by Johan Renck
New Order (band) songs
Song recordings produced by John Leckie
Songs written by Bernard Sumner
Songs written by Peter Hook
Songs written by Phil Cunningham (rock musician)
Songs written by Stephen Morris (musician)
Warner Records singles